Chamonixia pachydermis, is a species of fungus in the family Boletaceae, found in New Zealand.

C. pachydermis is common in areas of New Zealand beech forest and is often partially buried on the ground. It has a blue discoloration.

References

Boletaceae
Fungi of New Zealand